The white-toothed brush mouse (Brassomys albidens), also known as the white-toothed melomys or white-toothed mouse, is a species of rodent in the family Muridae. It is found only in West Papua, Indonesia. It is the only species in genus Brassomys. Its natural habitats are subtropical or tropical dry forests and subtropical or tropical dry lowland grassland.

The species was initially described in genus Melomys, but was then placed in the genus Coccymys.

References

Old World rats and mice
Mammals of Western New Guinea
Mammals described in 1951
Taxonomy articles created by Polbot
Rodents of New Guinea
Taxa named by George Henry Hamilton Tate